The Climate Action Plan (CAP)  in Boulder, Colorado is a set of strategies intended to guide community efforts for reducing greenhouse gas emissions. These strategies have focused on improving energy efficiency and conservation in homes and businesses — the source of nearly three-fourths of local emissions. The plan also promotes strategies to reduce emissions from transportation, which account for over 20 percent of local greenhouse gas sources.

General information
In November 2006, citizens of Boulder, Colorado, voted to approve Ballot Issue No. 202, authorizing the city council to levy and collect an excise tax from residential, commercial and industrial electricity customers for the purpose of funding a climate action plan to reduce greenhouse gas emissions. The plan outlines programs to increase energy efficiency, increase renewable energy use, reduce emissions from motor vehicles, and take other steps toward meeting the goals set in the Kyoto Protocol.

Beginning April 1, 2007 and expiring March 31, 2013, the initial tax rate was set at $0.0022/kWh for residential customers, $0.0004/kWh for commercial customers, and $0.0002/kWh for industrial customers. The city council has the authority to increase the tax after the first year up to a maximum permitted tax rate of $0.0049/kWh for residential customers; $0.0009/kWh for commercial customers; and $0.0003/kWh for industrial customers. Voluntary purchases of utility-provided wind power are exempt from the tax.

Allocation and generation of fund
Charge:
March 2010 rates for electricity customers:
 

Total Fund: $860,265 in the first year and up to $1,342,000/year thereafter through March 31, 2013
Purpose: Renewable energy, energy efficiency, transportation.

Incentive authority
Authority 1: Ballot Issue 202 (Climate Action Plan Tax)
Date Enacted:11/7/2006

Authority 2: Boulder Revised Code 3-12
Date Effective: 4/1/2007
Expiration Date: 3/31/2013

See also
Carbon pricing
Global Action Plan
Transition Towns
Greenhouse gas emissions by the United States
Chicago Climate Action Plan
San Francisco Climate Action Plan
Biodiversity Action Plan
Obama’s Climate Action Plan

References

External links
 Boulder's Climate Commitment (City of Boulder 
 Climate action in Boulder County
 DSIRE Database of State Incentives for Renewables & Efficiency.
 Bay Area Air Quality Management District
 Spare the Air website
 Managing TitleV Compliance
 Clean air reference website
 Fireplace Rebate Fund
 BAAQMD phone numbers – including 800-EXHAUST (800-394-2878) to report auto exhaust pollution

Air pollution
Emissions reduction
Climate action plans
Boulder, Colorado
Environment of Colorado